Jacob Dickinson may refer to:

 Jacob M. Dickinson (1851–1928), United States Secretary of War, 1909–1911
 Jacob Alan Dickinson (1911–1971), American attorney in Kansas